Holobutiv – village (selo) is located in Stryi Raion, Lviv Oblast, of Western Ukraine. It belongs to Stryi urban hromada, one of the hromadas of Ukraine. The population of the village is 937, and the local government is administered by the Holobutivska village council.
The first record of the village dates back to the year 1664.

References

External links 
 village Holobutiv
 Культурна спадщина. 15. Городище, с. Голобутів.
 weather.in.ua

Villages in Stryi Raion